Major General Nitzan Alon (born 1964) is a general in the Israel Defense Forces. In December 2011, he was named GOC Central Command and became Head of Central Command in early 2012. He became a commissioned officer after completing the 12-week-long school IDF Officer Candidate School. Alon went on further and graduated from the École de l'infanterie, a French military academy for further training for commissioned military officers. He then attended the École Militaire Interarmes or EMIA, a military school of the French Army intended to form and train military staff including Senior officers who have risen from the ranks.

Between 1984 and 2000, Alon was assigned to various positions in the IDF elite General Staff Special Forces Sayeret Matkal, being appointed its commander in 2001, serving in that position until 2004. While commanding Sayeret Matkal, he was awarded the Chief of Staff Citation for a covert mission he commanded. In 2001, he began working as a research associate in Washington, D.C. In 2003, he was appointed as commander of the IDF 551st Brigade Hitzey HaEsh (Fire Arrows) and in 2005 as commander of the Etzyon Regional Brigade in the IDF Central Command. In 2007, he was appointed as Head of the Israel Defense Military Intelligence.

From 2009 until October 2011, he served as commander of the Judea and Samaria Division. In 2012, he became the new head of the central command. The appointment was criticized by right wing organisations and political figures, including representatives of the Jewish settlers in the West Bank. A spokesperson for the Mateh Binyamin Regional Council stated that Alon′s appointment to head the IDF′s Central Command "represents a certain aspect of 'price tag' on the part of the defense minister", but gave Alon credit for being "intelligent, wise and courageous", according to Arutz Sheva.

During his term as commander of the Judea and Samaria Division, Alon was harshly criticized by the Jewish settlers in the West Bank who claim that he is "stacked against the settler movement". In July 2011, settlers attacked his military jeep at Tapuah Junction, and protested outside his home, harassing him and his family. The Jerusalem Post called him "the most radical, politically insubordinate officer to have held the position in recent memory", claiming that he "went out of his way to demonize and attack Israeli residents of Judea and Samaria, [claiming] without evidence continuously ... that acts of vandalism against Arab property in Judea and Samaria and inside of the 1949 armistice lines is the work of Jewish residents of the areas".

At the end of his term as commander of the Judea and Samaria Division, Alon stated: "Even today an extremist minority, small in number but not in influence, could bring about a major escalation via acts that are dubbed 'price tag', but amount to terrorism. [These acts] should not just be condemned for their inherent injustice and stupidity; they must be stopped, and their perpetrators arrested, more effectively than we have succeeded in doing thus far". In an editorial, the Israeli daily Haaretz called his stance "supremely statesmanlike", and the proof "that not only is he a brave and decorated soldier, but he is also a man of conscience, who fears for the future of his society".

Alon is married to Mor Alon. The couple has four children.

References

1964 births
Living people
Israeli generals
Technion – Israel Institute of Technology alumni
Place of birth missing (living people)